The  was an army of the Imperial Japanese Army occupying Malaya during the final days of World War II.

History
The Japanese 29th Army was initially raised on January 6, 1944, at Taiping, Perak in Japanese-occupied Malaya as a garrison force, and in anticipation of any Allied attempt to invade and retake the Malay Peninsula. The army's headquarters was at what is now the Peking Hotel, 2 Jalan Idris, also the site of the Kempeitai Headquarters.

Initially under command of the Southern Expeditionary Army Group, the IJA 29th Army was transferred to the Japanese Seventh Area Army on March 27, 1944. The Commanding Officer was Lieutenant General Teizo Ishiguro. His Chief of Staff was Major General Masukura Fujimura. When Fujimura was transferred to the 13th Area Army on its formation on 1 February 1945, Major General Naokazu Kawahara became Chief of Staff. Kawahara had been Commander of the 26th Mixed Brigade in Java.

As the war situation on the Pacific front grew increasingly desperate for Japan, the Imperial Japanese Army was unable to provide reinforcements and resupply to units south of the Philippines. After the surrender of Japan the 29th Army formally surrendered to Lieutenant-General Ouvry Roberts of the 34th Indian Corps at the Victoria Institution, Kuala Lumpur on 13 September 1945. Neither the 29th Army nor the 34th Indian Corps had seen combat. The 29th Army was then demobilized.

List of Commanders

Final headquarters configuration at the end of the war
Commander: Ishiguro Teizo lieutenant general
 Chief of Staff: Kawahara Naokazu Major General 
 Chief of Staff Deputy and military Affairs Director: Umezu Hirokichi Rear Admiral
 Staff: Oguri Army colonel two
 Adjutant: Ushio KuniNaru Colonel
 Weapons Director: Kawamura JunAkira Colonel
 Accounting Director: Yoshifumi Nomura accountant Colonel
 Surgeon General Manager: Ohtsubo YoshiNoboru surgeon Colonel
 Veterinary Director: Yano Yasuo veterinary Colonel
 Legal Director: Miki Yukio Legal Lieutenant Colonel

Final units
94th Infantry Division raised in 1944 and under Lieutenant General Tsunamasa Shidei
 35th Independent Mixed Brigade formed in Tokyo on 10 February 1944 stationed on the Andaman Islands under Lieutenant General Yoshitsugu Inoue. Sub-units were: 
251st Independent infantry battalion 
252nd Independent infantry battalion 
253rd Independent infantry battalion 
254th Independent infantry battalion 
255th Independent infantry battalion 
256th Independent infantry battalion 
257th Independent infantry battalion 
Brigade artillery group 
Brigade engineer unit 
Brigade communication unit 
 36th Independent Mixed Brigade formed in Tokyo on 10 February 1944 and based on the Nicobar Islands under Major General Toshio Itsuki. Itsuki was executed as a war criminal on 3 May 1946. 
258th Independent infantry battalion 
259th Independent infantry battalion 
260th Independent infantry battalion 
261st Independent infantry battalion 
Brigade artillery group 
Brigade engineer unit 
Brigade communication unit 
 37th Independent Mixed Brigade formed in Osaka on 10 February 1944 under Major General Noboru Sato
262nd Independent infantry battalion 
263rd Independent infantry battalion 
264th Independent infantry battalion 
265th Independent infantry battalion 
Brigade artillery group 
Brigade engineer unit 
Brigade communication unit
 70th Independent Mixed Brigade formed in Saigon in December 1944 under Major General Oda Masato 
428th Independent infantry battalion
429th Independent infantry battalion
430th Independent infantry battalion
431st Independent infantry battalion
 15th Armoured Regiment (Kanikobaru Island): Fukuda Hayashisugi Lieutenant Colonel
 Independent tank 29 Battalion: Miyaji Tatsumi Major
 Independent field artillery 1st Battalion: Sakagami Shigeo Lieutenant Colonel
 29th Army Military Police Corps (Taiping): in January 1944 3rd Field Kempeitai under Major-General Kojima Masanori (児島正範) replaced Lieutenant Colonel Oishi Masayuki 2nd Field Kempeitai
 Third communication Corps headquarters (Taiping)
Logistics troops
 16th Field transport headquarters: Honma Kotaro Colonel
 Special car 16th Battalion
South eighth Army Hospital (Kuala Lumpur): Imamura SakuTakeshi surgeon Colonel
 Chapter 130 logistics hospital (Port Blair): Ito Hideo surgeon Lieutenant Colonel
 Chapter 131 logistics hospital (Kanikobaru Island): Junichi Watanabe surgeon Lieutenant Colonel
 Chapter 135 logistics hospital (Kamoruta Island): Inada Seiichi surgeon Colonel
29th Army Depot
29th Army Field arsenal
29th Army Field automobile Factory
29th Army Field cargo Factory

Lieutenant General Teizo Ishiguro
Ishiguro (石黒貞蔵) was the former Commander of the 6th Army which had been based in Manchuria. In May 1944 the Army participated in Operation Ichi-Go On 1 July 1944 Ishiguro was appointed Commander of the newly formed 29th Army and based in Malaya in anticipation of an Allied attack.

References

External links

Notes

29
Military units and formations established in 1944
Military units and formations disestablished in 1945
J